Dourtenga  is a department or commune of Koulpélogo Province in eastern Burkina Faso. Its capital lies at the town of Dourtenga. According to the 1996 census the department has a total population of 8,693.

Towns and villages
 Dourtenga (3 276 inhabitants) (capital)
 Gogo (578 inhabitants)
 Gorin (406 inhabitants)
 Kangretenga (617 inhabitants)
 Kanle (267 inhabitants)
 Katoulbere (831 inhabitants)
 Niondin (473 inhabitants)
 Sougoudin (1 039 inhabitants)
 Tangoko (505 inhabitants)
 Yambili (316 inhabitants)
 Youmtenga (66 inhabitants)
 Zergoama (319 inhabitants)

References

Departments of Burkina Faso
Koulpélogo Province